Frank Wills (February 4, 1948 – September 27, 2000) was a security guard best known for his role in foiling the June 17, 1972, break-in at the Democratic National Committee inside the Watergate complex in Washington, D.C. Then 24, Wills called the police after discovering that locks at the complex had been tampered with. Five men were arrested inside the Democratic headquarters, which they had planned to bug. The arrests triggered the Watergate scandal and eventually the resignation of President Richard M. Nixon in 1974. Although hailed as a hero, Wills did not receive much financial reward or a promotion and later had difficulty finding work. He did media appearances and played himself in the 1976 film All the President's Men. but spent much of his life jobless and in poverty.

Early life
Wills was born in Savannah, Georgia. His parents separated when he was a child and he was primarily raised by his mother, Margie.

After dropping out of high school in 11th grade, Wills studied heavy machine operations in Battle Creek, Michigan and earned his equivalency degree from the Job Corps. He found an assembly-line job working for Ford in Detroit, Michigan. He later had to give up his assembly-line job due to health issues, namely asthma. Wills then traveled to Washington, D.C. and worked at a few hotels before landing a job as a security guard at the Watergate hotel.

Watergate hotel

In June 1972, Wills, at the age of 24, was working as a private security guard at the Watergate office building on the shores of the Potomac River. This was the location of the Democratic National Committee (DNC) headquarters. In the one year that Wills had worked there, there had been only one attempted burglary. In fact, it was considered so safe that security officers in the building only carried around a can of mace.

On the night of June 17, Wills noticed a piece of duct tape on one of the door locks when he was making his first round. The tape was placed over the latch bolt to prevent the door from latching shut. He removed the tape and continued on his patrol. Thirty minutes later, Wills returned to the door and noticed there was more tape on the same door. Without hesitation, Wills rushed up to the lobby telephone and asked for the Second Precinct police. The police turned off the elevators and locked the doors while accompanying Wills to search the offices one by one. Five men were found in the DNC offices. Wills recalled in 1997, "When we turned the lights on, one person, then two persons, then three persons came out, and on down the line." Details that emerged during their questioning and trials triggered the Watergate scandal. The five men arrested were Bernard L. Barker, Virgilio Gonzalez, Eugenio Martinez, James W. McCord Jr., and Frank Sturgis.

Aftermath

One story reports that after the Watergate break-in, he received a raise of $2.50 per week above his previous $80 per week salary. Another story states he wanted, but did not receive, a promotion for discovering the burglary.

According to The New York Times, Wills quit his job because he did not receive a raise. He then struggled staying employed because media opportunities and appearances kept him away from work, most of which consisted of minimum wage jobs. 

Wills played himself in the 1976 film All the President's Men. The book and film were based on Bob Woodward and Carl Bernstein's 1974 book accounting their investigation into the Watergate scandal. Wills also appeared briefly on the talk show circuit.

A scene of Wills discovering the taped door latches was enacted in the 2017 film The Post, directed by Steven Spielberg, starring Meryl Streep and Tom Hanks.

The 2022 television series Gaslit, starring Julia Roberts and Sean Penn, depicts Wills making his rounds at the hotel and discovering the door being taped open two different times.

Wills' log entry made on June 17, 1972 at 1:47 a.m. is memorialized in the National Archives.

Later life and poverty
Over the next 20 years, Wills struggled to establish and maintain roots and stability while suffering bouts of unemployment. He shuttled between Washington and other southern cities, with some time spent in The Bahamas. He said in an interview that Howard University feared losing their federal funding if they hired him. A security job with Georgetown University did not last long. Also, he worked in a failed stint as a diet food spokesperson for the comedian Dick Gregory.

In the mid-1970s, Wills finally settled in North Augusta, South Carolina, to care for his aging mother, who had suffered a stroke. Together, they survived on her $450 per month Social Security checks. In 1979, Wills was convicted of shoplifting and fined $20. Four years later, he was convicted of shoplifting a pair of sneakers from a store in Augusta, Georgia and sentenced to one year in prison. By the time of his mother's death in 1993, Wills was so destitute that he had to donate her body to medical research because he had no money with which to bury her.

Only when significant anniversaries of the Watergate break-in occurred did the waning spotlight reach out towards him again. In 1992, on the 20th anniversary of the burglary of the DNC headquarters, reporters asked if he were given the chance to do it all over again, would he? Wills replied with annoyance, "That's like asking me if I'd rather be white than black. It was just a part of destiny." That same year, Wills told a Boston Globe reporter, "I put my life on the line. I went out of my way.... If it wasn't for me, Woodward and Bernstein would not have known anything about Watergate. This wasn't finding a dollar under a couch somewhere." Wills was quoted saying, "Everybody tells me I'm some kind of hero, but I certainly don't have any hard evidence. I did what I was hired to do but still I feel a lot of folk don't want to give me credit, that is, a chance to move upward in my job".

Otherwise, Wills tended his garden, made the local library his study, and led a quiet life with his cats. Frank Wills died at the Medical College of Georgia hospital in Augusta, Georgia at the age of 52 from a brain tumor.

Recognition
Frank Wills was honored by the NAACP. The civil rights organization presented him with a truck.

Musician Harry Nilsson dedicated his 1973 album A Little Touch of Schmilsson in the Night to Wills for his role in bringing down Nixon.

The Democratic National Committee gave Wills an award, and the chairman said he had played "a unique role in the history of the nation." 

According to Wills' obituary in The New York Times, the "most eloquent description of his role" in American history came on July 29, 1974; Rep. James Mann (D-South Carolina), while casting his vote to impeach Nixon on the House Judiciary Committee, said:"If there is no accountability, another president will feel free to do as he chooses. But the next time there may be no watchman in the night."

References

1948 births
2000 deaths
20th-century African-American people
Deaths from brain cancer in the United States
People from Dupont Circle
People from North Augusta, South Carolina
People from Savannah, Georgia
Security guards convicted of crimes
Watergate scandal investigators